Vasco da Gama Fernandes  (4 November 1908 – 9 August 1991), was a Portuguese lawyer and politician.

Background
He was named after his most remote relative Vasco da Gama.

Career
Vasco da Gama Fernandes was licensee in Law, from the faculty of Law of the University of Lisbon, and became a lawyer and politician. Distinguished as an oppositioner to Estado Novo, being arrested for several times by the political police (PIDE), he joined the Aliança Republicana e Socialista (ARS) and later to the Movimento de Unidade Nacional Antifascista (MUNAF). In 1945, he was one of the founders of the Movimento de Unidade Democrática (MUD), and also of the Partido Trabalhista in 1947 and the Socialist Party (PS) in 1973.

After the Carnation Revolution, he was elected a deputy and vice-president of the Constituent Assembly for PS and, when reelected to the Assembly of the Republic, he also became its 1st President from 29 July 1976 to 29 October 1978, also becoming inherently a member of the Portuguese Council of State.

In 1979, he resigned from PS, joining then the Frente Republicana e Socialista (FRS) and later founded the Democratic Renovator Party (PRD). For this party he was again elected deputy in the legislative elections of 1985 and 1987.

References

1908 births
1991 deaths
People from São Vicente, Cape Verde
Socialist Party (Portugal) politicians
Democratic Renewal Party (Portugal) politicians
Presidents of the Assembly of the Republic (Portugal)
20th-century Portuguese lawyers